HotCha is a former Hong Kong cantopop trio group presented by Neway Star Entertainment. The members include Regen Cheung (張惠雅), Crystal Cheung (張紋嘉), and Winkie Lai (黎美言). The group debuted on April 4, 2007 and disbanded in 2014.

In 2018, the 11th year of the group's career, the three former members reunited for a special charity concert, which was held on June 3, in order to commemorate the group's 10th anniversary.

Albums 
 Hotcha (2007)
 Hotcha Sexy Funny Cool (2008)
 Hotcha Shall We Dance Shall We Love? (2009)
 Hotcha Our Favorites 我們最愛的 (2010)
 Three On The Road 3個人在途上(2011)
 0103(2012)
 New Chapter Ultimate Collection (2014)

TVB Series 
 Colours of Love (森之愛情) (2007) HotCha as shopping assistants
 Dressage To Win (盛裝舞步愛作戰) (2008) Guest role
 Your Class or Mine (尖子攻略) (2008) Cameo role
 The Season of Fate (五味人生) (2010) Regen Cheung as Lei Shi-mui/Tai Kat, a swindler's apprentice
 Sisters of Pearl (掌上明珠) (2010) Crystal Cheung as Young Chu Pik-Ha

Films 
 Mysterious Fighter Project A (2018) 
 Fortune Cookies (2012) 
 The Cases (2012) 
 Give Love (2009) 
 All's Well, Ends Well 2009 (2009) 
 Nobody's Perfect (2008) 
 Forgive and Forget (2008)

References

External links 
Neway Star Official website
HotCha Fans Club

Cantonese-language singers
Cantopop musical groups
Hong Kong girl groups
Hong Kong idols
Musical trios
Musical groups established in 2007
Musical groups disestablished in 2022